The Choice 2020: Trump vs. Biden is a 2020 television documentary film about the Republican and Democratic Party nominees for the 2020 United States presidential election: President Donald Trump and former Vice President Joe Biden respectively. Produced by the investigative journalism program Frontline for PBS, it aims to better inform American voters in their choice by recounting the two major nominees' character and past deeds. Co-produced and directed by Michael Kirk, the film premiered on PBS and simultaneously made available to stream on the broadcaster's website and YouTube channel on September 22, 2020. Biden would ultimately be elected President of the United States that November, setting a record for the most votes ever received by a presidential candidate. He also became the first man to defeat an incumbent president in 28 years and received the highest percentage of the popular vote over an incumbent president since Franklin Roosevelt in 1932.

Interviewees

Yamiche Alcindor, PBS NewsHour
Peter Baker, journalist
Jill Biden, wife of Joe Biden
John Bolton, former National Security Advisor
Carol Moseley Braun, former senator
Rep. Jim Clyburn, since 1993
Rudy Giuliani, Donald Trump's lawyer
Valerie Jarrett, fmr. Obama adviser
Rep. Jim Jordan, since 2007
Corey Lewandowski, fmr. Trump campaign manager
David Marcus, cousin of Roy Cohn
Peggy Noonan, The Wall Street Journal political columnist
Valerie Biden Owens, Joe Biden's sister
Anthony Scaramucci, fmr. Trump campaign adviser
Yusef Salaam, Central Park jogger case
Bakari Sellers, CNN political analyst
Mary Trump, Donald Trump's niece
Angela Wright, Clarence Thomas accuser

Production
The Choice 2020 is the ninth installment of The Choice, a series of television films produced by the American investigative journalism program Frontline beginning in 1988, with each film aiming to better inform American voters about the two major candidates of a respective presidential election. The installment was first discussed at a Television Critics Association press tour by director Michael Kirk and Frontline executive producer Raney Aronson-Rath on July 28, 2020, and was later formally announced on August 7. A three-minute trailer was released on the same day of its announcement.

Kirk explained that he approached the film seeking a new way of telling the stories of President Donald Trump and former Vice President Joe Biden, as they are "two people who have been in the public eye for a half century". Due to the COVID-19 pandemic afflicting the United States during the 2020 election season, the film's production team could not fully conduct face-to-face interviews as done in previous installments of The Choice. Kirk stated that the team had to use the videotelephony software program Zoom for most of their interviews, stating that "I’m used to interviewing people for hours at a time. Doing that over Zoom is a challenge in its own." At the same time, Kirk considers The Choice 2020 to be the "most important and essential" out of the five installments he has made so far due to the nation's deep political divide, along with the pandemic, a weakened economy, and renewed grievances against systemic racism.

As the film was aired during what Rath described as a "perilous time" for the United States, Frontline decided to release some of its interviews in advance of the film's premiere as part of the program's ongoing Transparency Project, beginning on September 14 with Mary Trump's interview.

Reception 
The Daily Beast wrote, "Beyond spin...thoughtful [and] in-depth."

References

External links
 (Official PBS site)

2020 films
2020 television films
2020 documentary films
American documentary television films
Biographical television films
Cultural depictions of Joe Biden
Documentary films about politicians
Documentary films about presidents of the United States
Films about Donald Trump
Films about the 2020 United States presidential election
Frontline (American TV program)
Films directed by Michael Kirk
2020s English-language films
2020s American films